Luther Christopher Peck (January 1800 – February 5, 1876) was a U.S. Representative from New York.

Born in Farmington, Connecticut in January 1800, Peck completed preparatory studies and taught school in Holley, New York. He studied law, was admitted to the bar and practiced.

He moved to Allegheny County, Pennsylvania, and later to Pike, New York, and continued the practice of law. Held various local offices.

Peck was elected as a Whig to the Twenty-fifth and Twenty-sixth Congresses (March 4, 1837 – March 3, 1841).  He served as chairman of the Committee on Revisal and Unfinished Business (Twenty-sixth Congress).

He resumed the practice of his profession in Pike. He was affiliated with the Republican Party after it was formed.

He moved to Nunda, New York, and continued the practice of law. He died in Nunda on February 5, 1876 and was interred in Oakwood Cemetery.

Sources

External links 

Arad Thomas, The Pioneer History of  Orleans County, NY, Biographies of Early Settlers: Horace Peck, 1871, pages 201-201

1800 births
1876 deaths
People from Farmington, Connecticut
People from Pike, New York
People from Nunda, New York
New York (state) Republicans
New York (state) lawyers
Whig Party members of the United States House of Representatives from New York (state)
People from Murray, New York
19th-century American politicians
19th-century American lawyers